Abraham Haim Schalit (1898, 21 August 1979) was an Israeli historian and a scholar of the Second Temple period.

Biography
Schalit was born in 1898 in the Galician town of Zolochiv, then in Austria-Hungary (from 1918 to 1939 in Poland and now in Ukraine). He studied at the University of Vienna. In 1929, he immigrated to Mandate Palestine, now Israel. In 1950, he joined the faculty of History Department of the Hebrew University of Jerusalem and was appointed a professor in 1959.

Major works
Abraham Schalit wrote his major works on Herod and Josephus. The discovery of his lost 1925 Vienna dissertation on Josephus shows a shift in his views. He originally saw Josephus as a bad historian but a patriot, sincerely seeking to further the rebels' cause against Rome. Later he regarded him as a pragmatist.

Awards
 In 1960, Schalit was awarded the Israel Prize in Jewish studies.
 Schalit was a recipient of the Tchernichovsky Prize for exemplary translation.

See also
List of Israel Prize recipients

References

1898 births
1979 deaths
People from Zolochiv, Lviv Oblast
Ukrainian Jews
Jewish historians
Historians of Jews and Judaism
University of Vienna alumni
Academic staff of the Hebrew University of Jerusalem
Israel Prize in Jewish studies recipients
Polish emigrants to Mandatory Palestine
Jews from Galicia (Eastern Europe)
Jews in Mandatory Palestine
20th-century Israeli historians